Skullcrusher is an American musician. 

Skullcrusher or skull crusher may also refer to:
 EJ Snyder (born 1965), American survivalist and television personality, nicknamed “Skullcrusher”
 "Skullcrusher", a song by American heavy metal band Biohazard from their album Reborn in Defiance
 "Skull crusher", another name for lying triceps extensions